Gotha I is an electoral constituency (German: Wahlkreis) represented in the Landtag of Thuringia. It elects one member via first-past-the-post voting. Under the current constituency numbering system, it is designated as constituency 14. It covers the southern part of the district of Gotha.

Gotha I was created in 1990 for the first state election. Since 2019, it has been represented by Birger Gröning of Alternative for Germany (AfD).

Geography
As of the 2019 state election, Gotha I covers the southern part of the district of Gotha, specifically the municipalities of Bad Tabarz/Thür. Wald, Emleben, Friedrichroda, Georgenthal/Thür. Wald, Herrenhof, Hohenkirchen, Leinatal, Luisenthal, Ohrdruf, Petriroda, Tambach-Dietharz/Thür. Wald, and Waltershausen.

Members
The constituency was held by the Christian Democratic Union from its creation in 1990 until 2019, during which time it was represented by Johanna Köhler (1990–1994), Franz Schuster (1994–2004), and Jürgen Reinholz (2004–2019). It was won by Alternative for Germany in 2019, and is represented by Birger Gröning.

Election results

2019 election

2014 election

2009 election

2004 election

1999 election

1994 election

1990 election

References

Electoral districts in Thuringia
1990 establishments in Germany
Gotha (district)
Constituencies established in 1990